Karoline "Lina" Radke-Batschauer (18 October 1903 – 14 February 1983) was a German track and field athlete. She was the first Olympic champion in the 800 m for women.

Born as Lina Batschauer, she started competing in athletics at the age of 20. In those years sports such as running were considered far too exhausting for women. This vision was shared by many, including the originator of the modern Olympic movement, Pierre de Coubertin.

In 1927, she married Georg Radke, who was her coach and a manager of her club SC Baden-Baden. The couple moved to Georg's hometown of Breslau (now Wrocław in Poland), where in 1927 Lina Radke set her first 800 m world record. Together with her husband, Lina Radke was one of the pioneers of female athletics in the mid-1920s. Competitions for women were not held frequently, but Radke nevertheless won several regional and national titles. She first specialised in the 1000 m, but when this was changed into the 800 m (because that distance would be held at the upcoming 1928 Summer Olympics), she switched to that event. The highlight of Radke's career were those 1928 Summer Olympics, as she won the inaugural title in the 800 m, earning the first German gold medal in athletics. Along the way, she set the first officially recognised world record in that event, 2:16.8, which would last until 1944. The IOC was however not pleased with the fact that several of Radke's competitors had been totally exhausted after the race, and decided to banish the event from the Games; it would not be included again until 1960.

In 1930 Radke set a 1,000 m world record. She retired in 1934, after finishing fourth in the 800 m at the last Women's World Games. After that she worked as athletics coach in Breslau and Torgau. Her husband took part in World War II and was held as a prisoner of war in the Soviet Union. Upon his release in 1950, the family moved to Karlsruhe.

References

Lina Radke. Encyclopædia Britannica
Radke wins controversial 800m gold medal. olympic.org

1903 births
1983 deaths
German female middle-distance runners
Athletes (track and field) at the 1928 Summer Olympics
Olympic athletes of Germany
Olympic gold medalists for Germany
Medalists at the 1928 Summer Olympics
Sportspeople from Karlsruhe
Olympic gold medalists in athletics (track and field)